Untitled is the title of the debut album from UK R&B / soul singer Terri Walker. The album was released in 2003 by Def Soul/Mercury Records and spawned 3 singles, "Guess You Didn't Love Me" (Featuring Mos Def), "Ching Ching (Lovin' You Still)" (her first and only UK top 40 hit to date) and "Drawing Board" (promo only).

The album was nominated for a MOBO award and it was also nominated for the Mercury Music Prize for album of the year.

Track listing
"Love Fool"
"Drawing Board"
"Guess You Didn't Love Me" (Featuring Mos Def)
"It's All Good"
"Ching Ching (Lovin' You Still)"
"Fake"
"What Will I Do" (Featuring Blueblood)
"Love You For Life"
"Deutschland"
"Dirty Weekend" (Featuring The Wise Children)
"4 Feet Under"
"Da Business"
"For Life [Reprise]"
"Brand New day"

Singles

2003 debut albums
Terri Walker albums
Mercury Records albums
Def Jam Recordings albums